Pays d'Aix Université Club Handball is a handball club from Aix-en-Provence, France. Currently, Pays d'Aix Université Club Handball competes in the French First League of Handball.

Crest, colours, supporters

Naming history

Kit manufacturers

Kits

Team

Current squad 

Squad for the 2022–23 season

Goalkeepers
 1  Alejandro Romero
 16  Wesley Pardin
Wingers
LW 
4  Matthieu Ong
 18  Xavier Labigang
RW
8  Gabriel Loesch
 64  Jordan Camarero
Line players 
7  Adrien Vergely
 15  Tomás Moreira
 41  Youssef Benali

Back players
LB
 5  Romain Lagarde
 14  Gerdas Babarskas
 21  William Accambray
CB
 28  Ian Tarrafeta
 77  Nicolas Claire
RB
3  Kristján Örn Kristjánsson 
 24  Diogo Silva

Transfers
Transfers for the 2022–23 season

 Joining
  Xavier Labigang (LW) (from  Grand Besançon DHB)  
  Gerdas Babarskas (LB) (from  Chambéry Savoie MBHB)
  Diogo Silva (RB)
  Youssef Benali (LP) (from  FC Barcelona) 
  Tomás Moreira (LP) (from  CB Ciudad de Logroño) 
  Adrien Vergely (LP) (from  Valence Handball) 

 Leaving
   Karl Konan (LB) (to  Montpellier Handball) 
   Micke Brasseleur (RB) (to  HC Dobrogea Sud Constanța) 
   Iñaki Peciña (LP) (to  Chambéry Savoie MBHB) 
   Marko Račić (LP) (to  RK Nexe Našice) 
   Théo Clarac (LP) (to  Bruges Lormont HB)

Former club members

Notable former players

  William Accambray (2020–)
  Baptiste Bonnefond (2019–2021)
  Nicolas Claire (2019–)
  Théo Derot (2017–2019)
  Jérôme Fernandez (2015–2017)
  Samuel Honrubia (2019–2021)
  Philippe Julia (1998–2005)
  Luka Karabatic (2012–2015)
  Nikola Karabatić (2013)
  Romain Lagarde (2021–)
  Yanis Lenne (2018-2019)
  Aymeric Minne (2015–2019)
  Wesley Pardin (2017–)
  Yohann Ploquin (2013-2015)
  Luc Tobie (2012–2016)
  Ayoub Abdi (2016–2017)
  Micke Brasseleur (2021–)
  Abdérazak Hamad (2009–2012)
  Tahar Labane (2008–2010)
  Sid Ali Yahia (2009–2012)
  Thomas Bauer (2016-2017)
  Robert Markotić (2014–2015)
  Mirza Šarić (2009-2011)
  Michal Kasal (2016)
  Mohamed Mamdouh (2016–2017)
  Ali Zein (2016–2018)
  Juan Andreu (2015–2019)
  Imanol Garciandia (2020–2021)
  Iosu Goñi Leoz (2013–2020)
  Isaías Guardiola (2015–2016)
  Iñaki Peciña (2017–2022)
  Joan Saubich (2015–2016)
  Ian Tarrafeta (2020-)
  Alexandros Vasilakis (2013–2014)
  Kristján Örn Kristjánsson (2020–)
   Gerdas Babarskas (2022-)
  Ole Erevik (2015–2017)
  Dean Bombač (2014)
  Klemen Cehte (2014–2015)
  Darko Cingesar (2017–2020)
  Vid Kavtičnik (2019–2020)
  Borut Oslak (2011–2013)
  Vladica Stojanović (2012–2016)
  Philip Stenmalm (2018–2019)
  Sergiy Onufriyenko (2016–2018)

Former coaches

References

External links
  
 

French handball clubs
Aix-en-Provence